Ekaterina Nikolayevna Chuprinina (born 20 September 1974), better known by her stage name Katya Lel, is a Russian pop singer.

Early life 
Chuprinina was born on September 20, 1974 in Nalchik, Kabardino-Balkar Autonomous Soviet Socialist Republic (now the Kabardino-Balkaria Republic). Katya spent her childhood there, where she graduated from music school.

Music studies 
In 1994, she attended the Russian Academy of Music's vocal department in Moscow. There, her teachers were Joseph Kobzon, who was acclaimed as the "official voice of the Soviet Union" and Lev Leshchenko, another renowned singer, who performed the closing theme at the 1980 Summer Olympics in Moscow.

In 1998, she graduated from the Academy with top honors.

Music career 
In 1998, following her graduation she started a solo career, releasing the successful album Champs Elysee and beginning a successful tour. In 2003, she changed the style of her performing music and began to work with producer Maxim Fadeev. During their partnership, the hit Moy Marmeladny (Мой Мармеладный) became a top chart song in a few of the Commonwealth of Independent States.

Discography

Studio albums
 Yeliseyskiye polya (1998)
 Talisman (1999)
 Sama (2000)
 Mezhdu nami (2002)
 Dzhaga-dzhaga (2004)
 Kruchu-verchu (2005)
 Ya tvoya (2008)
 Solntse lyubvi (2013)
 Moya tema (2019)
 Siyaniye (2020)

References

External links
 

1974 births
Living people
Musicians from Nalchik
Russian pop singers
Gnessin State Musical College alumni
21st-century Russian singers
21st-century Russian women singers